Big Tuna  may refer to:

People
 Bill Parcells, National Football League coach
 Jake Virtanen, National Hockey League forward for the Vancouver Canucks
 Jim Halpert, a fictional character on the American television series The Office
 Tony Accardo, organized crime leader
 Trevor Hirschfield, Canadian Wheelchair Rugby player
 A fictional character played by Vincent Barbi in the 1974 film "Black Belt Jones"

Other uses
 a fictional Texas town featured in the 1990 novel Wild at Heart by Barry Gifford and its 1990 film adaptation
 a house band featured on the album Revolution Overdrive: Songs of Liberty
 a nickname for the Olympus Zuiko Digital 300mm f/2.8 Four Thirds system camera lens

See also
Bigeye tuna (Thunnus obesus), a species of true tuna
Tuna (disambiguation)